HMAS Barricade (P 98) was an  of the Royal Australian Navy (RAN).

Design and construction

The Attack class was ordered in 1964 to operate in Australian waters as patrol boats (based on lessons learned through using the s on patrols of Borneo during the Indonesia-Malaysia Confrontation, and to replace a variety of old patrol, search-and-rescue, and general-purpose craft. Initially, nine were ordered for the RAN, with another five for Papua New Guinea's Australian-run coastal security force, although another six ships were ordered to bring the class to twenty vessels. Propulsion machinery consisted of two 16-cylinder Paxman YJCM diesel engines, which supplied  to the two propellers. The ship's company consisted of three officers and sixteen sailors. Main armament was a bow-mounted Bofors 40 mm gun, supplemented by two .50-calibre M2 Browning machine guns and various small arms. The ships were designed with as many commercial components as possible: the Attacks were to operate in remote regions of Australia and New Guinea, and a town's hardware store would be more accessible than home base in a mechanical emergency.

Barricade was built by Evans Deakin and Company at Brisbane, Queensland, launched on 29 June 1968, and commissioned on 26 October 1968.

Operational history
Barricade was transferred to the Indonesian Navy on 22 April 1982 and renamed KRI Sigalu.

Citations

References

Attack-class patrol boats
1968 ships